Kubad was the thirteenth Shah of Shirvan. He built a strong defense wall around Shamakhi in order to protect it from Oghuz invasions. He reigned for 6 years and died in 1049. He was then succeeded by his nephew Bukhtnassar.

References

Sources 
 

11th-century rulers in Asia
11th-century Iranian people